Jesús Huerta (born 22 June 1980) is a Mexican rower. He competed in the men's single sculls event at the 2000 Summer Olympics.

References

External links
 

1980 births
Living people
Mexican male rowers
Olympic rowers of Mexico
Rowers at the 2000 Summer Olympics
Rowers from Mexico City